The 2011–12 Eredivisie Vrouwen was the fifth season of the Netherlands women's professional football league. After a troubled build-up, the season took place from 2 September 2011 to 18 May 2012 with seven teams. 

Before the start of the season, on 30 August 2011, the BeNe Super Cup was played, a match where the Dutch champion FC Twente met Belgian champion Standard Liège. Twente lost the match 4–1. In sight of the cup a memorandum was signed by the Dutch and Belgian football associations to create an inter-country top-level league (BeNe League) to start as early as 2012–13.

FC Twente entered the season as reigning champions and finished as runners-up, behind ADO Den Haag. It was ADO Den Haag's first championship after finishing runners-up in the previous three seasons. The 63 matches of the season had a 44,607 total attendance.

Build-up
On 22 February 2011, a meeting between the League (Stichting Eredivisie Vrouwen - SEV), Royal Dutch Football Association (KNVB) and clubs was held to discuss possible improvement to the league. A statement from the KNVB announced the season's matchdays would move from Thursdays to Fridays, relationship changes between clubs and their affiliated amateur clubs, guideline principles amongst other topics discussed and the financial conditions were to be discussed on a further meeting, as the KNVB was trying to keep the league with eight teams. At the same day following the meeting, three time league champions AZ announced its withdraw from the league. On the following day Willem II announced it was also withdrawing from the league. Financial issues were responsible for both clubs decision. PSV Eindhoven, working to build a women's team, confirmed on 3 March 2011 it would not be able to participate in this season. On 8 March 2011, FC Utrecht also announced its withdraw due to financial reasons, but on 6 April 2011 retreated its withdraw and confirmed it had secured finances for the season. On 14 April 2011 it was SC Heerenveen who announced its withdraw due to financial issues, two weeks later, on 26 April 2011, as the club continued working to find sponsors to remain in the league, RBC Roosendaal presented a possibility of entering a team if its male team remained in Jupiler League. The KNVB extension of the clubs registration deadline allowed SC Heerenveen to secure the funds needed to play the season and on 28 April 2011 the club confirmed its participation. On 27 May 2011 SC Telstar was confirmed as the seventh team for the season.

Teams

AZ and Willem II withdrew from the league at the conclusion of the previous season. On 27 May 2011 it was announced that Telstar joined the league, becoming the seventh team of the season.

Source: Soccerway

Format
The season was played in a triple round-robin format, where all seven participating teams played each other three times (once at home, once away with the third confrontation defined by a lottery-system at the second half the season), a total of 18 matches each. The champion qualified to the UEFA Women's Champions League. There was no relegation system in place.

Standings

Results

First and second round

Third round

Top scorers

Source: VrouwenvoetbalNederland.nl, Soccerway

References

External links
Official website
Results 2011–2012
Season on soccerway.com

Ned
1
2011-12